Procuring or pandering is the facilitation or provision of a prostitute or other sex worker in the arrangement of a sex act with a customer. A procurer, colloquially called a pimp (if male) or a madam (if female, though the term pimp has still extensively been used for female procurers as well) or a brothel keeper, is an agent for prostitutes who collects part of their earnings. The procurer may receive this money in return for advertising services, physical protection, or for providing and possibly monopolizing a location where the prostitute may solicit clients. Like prostitution, the legality of certain actions of a madam or a pimp vary from one region to the next.

Examples of procuring include:
 Trafficking a person into a country for the purpose of soliciting sex
 Operating a business where prostitution occurs
 Transporting a prostitute to the location of their arrangement
 Deriving financial gain from the prostitution of another

Etymology

Procurer

The term procurer derives from the French .

Pimping
The word pimp first appeared in English in 1607, in a Thomas Middleton play entitled Your Five Gallants. It is of unknown origin, but may have stemmed from the French infinitive  meaning to dress up elegantly and from the present participle  meaning alluring in seductive dress. Pimp used as a verb, meaning to act as a pimp, first appeared in 1636 in Philip Massinger's play, The Bashful Lover. In the 18th and 19th centuries, the term was commonly used to refer to informers. A pimp can also mean "a despicable person". The term can also be applied to a person who is considered a ladies' man.

Rapper Nelly tried to redefine the word "pimp" by saying that it is an acronym for "positive, intellectual, motivated person". He created a college scholarship with the name "P.I.M.P. Juice Scholarship". Dawn Turner Trice of the Chicago Tribune argues that there is "something truly unsettling, to say the least, about attaching such a vile word to a scholarship" and expresses concern about the glamorization of the term.

In the first years of the 21st century, a new meaning of the word emerged in the form of a transitive verb pimp, which means "to decorate" or "to gussy up" (compare primp, especially in Scottish usage). This new definition was made popular by Pimp My Ride, an MTV television show. Although this new definition paid homage to hip-hop culture and its connection to street culture, it has now entered common, even mainstream commercial, use.

In medical contexts, the verb means "to ask (a student) a question for the purpose of testing her or his knowledge".

Pandering
The word "pander", meaning to "pimp", is derived from Pandarus, a licentious figure who facilitates the affair between the protagonists in Troilus and Criseyde, a poem by Geoffrey Chaucer. Pandarus appears with a similar role in Shakespeare's interpretation of the story, Troilus and Cressida.

Overview
Pimps and madams are diverse and variegated, depending on the strata in which they work, and they enter and leave the sex industry for a variety of internal and external reasons, such as family pressure, interactions with the police, and in some cases recruitment from peer sex workers.

Procuring can take abusive forms. Madams/pimps may punish clients for physical abuse or failure to pay, and enforce exclusive rights to "turf" where their prostitutes may advertise and operate with less competition. In the many places where prostitution is outlawed, sex workers have decreased incentive to report abuse for fear of self-incrimination, and increased motivation to seek any physical protection from clients and law enforcement that a madam/pimp might provide.

The madam/pimp–prostitute relationship is often understood to be abusive and possessive, with the pimp/madam using techniques such as psychological intimidation, manipulation, starvation, rape and/or gang rape, beating, tattooing to mark the woman as "theirs", confinement, threats of violence toward the victim's family, forced drug use and the shame from these acts. 

In the US, madams/pimps can be arrested and charged with pandering and are legally known as procurers. This, combined with the tendency to identify pimping with African-American masculinity, may provide some of the explanation for why approximately three-fifths of all "confirmed" human traffickers in the United States are African-American men. It has recently been argued that some of the extreme examples of violence cited in the article below come primarily from such stereotyping supported by Hollywood screenwriters, selective and decontextualized trial transcripts, and studies that have only interviewed parties to sex commerce in institutions of rescue, prosecution, and punishment, rather than engaging rigorous study in situ.

A 2018 study by researchers from the University of Montreal divided the concept of a pimp into three distinct categories: "low-profile" (primarily female), "hustlers" (predominantly male and violent, marking the common stereotype), and "abused" (even malefemale split, more likely to be subjected to violence than to commit it).

Legal status and debates about legality
Where prostitution is decriminalized or regulated, procuring may or may not be legal. Procuring regulations differ widely from place to place.

Procuring and brothels are legal in the Netherlands, Germany, Greece, New Zealand, and most of Australia and Nevada.

Canada

In Canada, there was a legal challenge to prostitution laws, which ended in the 2013 ruling of Bedford v. Canada. In 2010, Ontario Superior Court Judge Susan Himel overturned the national laws banning brothels and procuring, arguing that they violated the constitution guaranteeing "the right to life, liberty and security".

In 2012, the Court of Appeal for Ontario reaffirmed the unconstitutionality of the laws. The case was appealed by the Canadian government, and was under trial in the Supreme Court of Canada in June 2013. On 20 December 2013, the Supreme Court unanimously struck down the remaining prostitution laws. , the Canadian government began working on regulations to allow the trade to operate.

United Nations
The United Nations 1949 Convention for the Suppression of the Traffic in Persons and of the Exploitation of the Prostitution of Others requires state signatories to ban pimping and brothels, and to abolish regulation of individual prostitutes. It states:

Whereas prostitution and the accompanying evil of the traffic in persons for the purpose of prostitution are incompatible with the dignity and worth of the human person and endanger the welfare of the individual, the family and the community

The convention reads:

Article 1

The Parties to the present Convention agree to punish any person who, to gratify the passions of another:

(1) Procures, entices or leads away, for purposes of prostitution, another person, even with the consent of that person;

(2) Exploits the prostitution of another person, even with the consent of that person.

Article 2

The Parties to the present Convention further agree to punish any person who:

(1) Keeps or manages, or knowingly finances or takes part in the financing of a brothel;

(2) Knowingly lets or rents a building or other place or any part thereof for the purpose of the prostitution of others.

Various UN commissions however have differing positions on the issue. For example, in 2012, a UNAIDS commission convened by Ban Ki-moon and backed by UNDP and UNAIDS, recommended the decriminalization of brothels and procuring.

Business and methods

Pimping is typically operated like a business. The pimp may have a bottom girl who serves as office manager, keeping the pimp apprised of law-enforcement activity and collecting money from the prostitutes. Pimps recognize a hierarchy among themselves. In certain pimp strata, the least respected, or newer pimps, are the "popcorn pimps" and "wannabes". "Popcorn pimps" was a phenomenon which occurred among adolescent cocaine users of both sexes who utilized children younger than themselves to support their habits. A pimp who uses violence and intimidation to control his prostitutes is called a "gorilla pimp", while those who use psychological trickery to deceive younger prostitutes into becoming hooked into the system are called "finesse pimps". In addition, a prostitute may "bounce" from pimp to pimp without paying the "pimp moving" tax.

Some pimps in the United States are also documented gang members, which causes concerns for police agencies in jurisdictions where prostitution is a significant problem. Pimping rivals narcotic sales as a major source of funding for many gangs. Gangs need money to survive, and money equates to power and respect. While selling drugs may be lucrative for a gang, this activity often carries significant risk as stiff legal penalties and harsh mandatory minimum sentencing laws exist. However, with pimping, gang members still make money while the prostitutes themselves bear the majority of the risk. Pimping has several benefits to the gang that the pimp belongs to. These benefits include helping the gang recruit new members because the gang has women available for sex, and the money brought in by prostitution allows gang members to buy cars, clothes and weapons, all of which help to recruit younger members into the gang by increasing the reputation of the gang in the local gang subculture.

Violence 
Some pimp businesses have an internal structure – built around violence – for dealing with rule breakers. For example, some pimps have been known to employ a "pimp stick", which is two coat hangers wrapped together, in order to subdue unruly prostitutes. Although prostitutes can move between pimps, this movement sometimes leads to violence. For example, a prostitute could be punished for merely looking at another pimp; this is considered in some pimp milieus to be "reckless eyeballing". Violence can also be used on customers, for example if the customer attempts to evade payment or becomes unruly with a prostitute.

Grooming 

Some pimps employ what is known as the "Loverboy" or "Romeo pimp" method to recruit new prostitutes. This involves entrapping potential victims (usually young or vulnerable women) by first forming what appears to the victim to be a romantic relationship. After an initial period of "love bombing", the treatment of the victim then becomes abusive, and the victim is then forced into sex work by the pimp.

Use of tattoos
Some pimps tattoo prostitutes as a mark of "ownership". The tattoo will often be the pimp's street name or even his likeness. The mark might be as discreet as ankle tattoo, or blatant as a neck tattoo or large scale font across the prostitute's lower back, thigh, chest, or buttocks.

Internet effect
Since the Internet became widely available, prostitutes increasingly use websites to solicit sexual encounters. This has bypassed the need for pimps in some contexts, while some pimps have used these sites to broker their sex workers.

Criticism of portrayals
Some scholars and sex workers' rights advocates dispute portrayals of third-party agents as violent and extremely committed to a pimp subculture, finding them inaccurate exaggerations used to foster harmful policies. For example, one study found that pimps tend to drift in and out of pimping, with some of their goals and identities classified as predominantly mainstream, some as predominantly outside of that mainstream, and some as a hybrid of conventional and non-conventional.

Pornography
Attempts have been made in the US to charge pornographic-film producers with pandering under state law. The case of California v. Freeman in 1989 is one of the most prominent examples where a producer/director of pornographic films was charged with pandering under the argument that paying porn actors to perform sex on camera was a form of prostitution covered by a state anti-pandering statute. The State Supreme Court rejected this argument, finding that the California pandering statute was not intended to cover the hiring of actors who would be engaging in sexually-explicit but non-obscene performances. It also stated that only in cases where the producer paid the actors for the purpose of sexually gratifying themselves or other actors, could the producer be charged with pandering under state law. This case effectively legalized pornography in the State of California. In 2008, the New Hampshire Supreme Court issued a similar ruling (New Hampshire v. Theriault) which declared that producing pornography was not a form of prostitution under state law.

Art

Notable pimps and madams

 Elizabeth Adams
 Polly Adler
 Ah Toy
 Brenda Allen
 Sydney Biddle Barrows
 Scotty Bowers
 Kid Cann
 Belle Cora (Arabella Ryan)
 Kristin M. Davis
 Shirley Finn
 Heidi Fleiss (madam)
 Marguerite Gourdan (madam)
 Lou Graham
 Dennis Hof
 Xaviera Hollander
 Don "Magic" Juan
 Mary-Anne Kenworthy (madam)
 Gangubai Kothewali (madam)
 Isabel La Negra
 Meyer Lansky
 Ghislaine Maxwell
 Enriqueta Martí
 Mother Damnable
 Elizabeth Needham
 Dora Noyce (madam)
 Deborah Jeane Palfrey
 Justine Paris (madam)
 Grace Peixotto
 Lovisa von Plat
 Jurjentje Aukes Rauwerda
 Lindi St Clair (madam)
 Fillmore Slim
 Iceberg Slim
 Sally Stanford
 Al Swearengen
 Anna Wilson (madam)
 Leonid Radvinsky

See also

 American Pimp, a 1999 documentary by the Hughes brothers consisting of first-person interviews with people involved in the pimping lifestyle in the US
 Brothel, a place where people engage in sexual activity with prostitutes

References

External links

Prostitution
Organized crime activity